Bandar-e Tang (also Romanized as Bandar Tang; also known as Bandar-e Tank, Bandar Tānk, Tang, and Tānk) is a village in Kahir Rural District, in the Central District of Konarak County, Sistan and Baluchestan Province, Iran. At the 2006 census, its population was 1,005, in 171 families.

Native nature of Tang port
Tang port or Bandar-e Tang is a small part of Chabahar. This village due to the coincide of the desert and the sea, Gulf of Oman, have a special and unique attractions. There are some unique natural attractions in this small port. The sandy and rocky sandy beaches and the hills of the village make amazing natural view for tourism.

References 

Populated places in Konarak County